Tryonia is a genus of freshwater snails in the family Hydrobiidae. This genus is sometimes placed in the family Cochliopidae

Snails of this genus are very small with narrow shells. Females brood young within the genital tract. Species usually live in springs. The genus is differentiated from others by the structure of the male and female reproductive systems.

Most of these snails occur in western North America, especially the Chihuahuan Desert. There are also species known in Florida and Guatemala.

Species
Species include:
 Tryonia adamantina – Diamond Y springsnail, Diamond tryonia
 Tryonia aequicostata – smooth-rib hydrobe
 Tryonia alamosae – Alamosa springsnail, Caliente tryonia
 Tryonia angulata – Sportinggoods tryonia
 Tryonia brevissima – regal hydrobe
 Tryonia brunei – Brune's tryonia
 Tryonia cheatumi – Phantom tryonia, Cheatum's snail
 Tryonia circumstriata
 Tryonia clathrata Stimpson, 1865 – grated tryonia (the type species)
 Tryonia diaboli – devil tryonia
 Tryonia elata – Point of Rocks tryonia
 Tryonia ericae – minute tryonia
 Tryonia gilae – Gila tryonia
 Tryonia imitator – mimic tryonia, California brackish water snail
 Tryonia infernalis – Blue Point Tryonia
 Tryonia kosteri – Koster's tryonia, Sago tryonia
 Tryonia margae – Grapevine Springs elongate tryonia
 Tryonia protea – desert tryonia
 Tryonia quitobaquitae – Quitabaquito tryonia
 Tryonia robusta – robust tryonia
 Tryonia rowlandsi – Grapevine Springs squat tryonia
 Tryonia salina – Cottonball Marsh tryonia
 Tryonia seemani (Frauenfeld, 1863)
 Tryonia variegata – Amargosa tryonia

References

External links 
 Myers, P., et al. 2014. Tryonia. The Animal Diversity Web.
 Hershler, R. (1999). A systematic review of the hydrobiid snails (Gastropoda: Rissoidea) of the Great Basin, western United States. Part II. Genera Colligyrus, Fluminicola, Pristinicola, and Tryonia". The Veliger 42(4) 306-37.
 Hershler, R. & F. G. Thompson. (1987). North American Hydrobiidae (Gastropoda: Rissoacea): redescription and the systematic relationships of Tryonia Stimpson, 1865 and Pyrgulopsis Call and Pilsbry, 1886. The Nautilus 101(1) 25-32.
 Stimpson, W. (1865). Researches upon the Hydrobiinae and allied forms chiefly made upon materials in the museum of the Smithsonian Institution. Smithsonian Miscellaneous Collections 7 (201): 1-59. page 48.
 Thompson F.G. (2011) An annotated checklist and bibliography of the land and freshwater snails of México and central America. Florida Museum of Natural History, Bulletin 50(1): 1-299.

 
Cochliopidae
Taxa named by William Stimpson